The International Museum of Carousel Art was a museum in Hood River in the U.S. state of Oregon focused on carousels.  The museum claimed to be the largest such collection in the world. It had 8,000 to 10,000 visitors per year.

The museum was founded in 1983 as the Portland Carousel Museum after the founders, Duane and Carol Perron, helped restore a 1914 carousel in the late 1970s. It was a non-profit organization. The Hood River museum opened October 17, 1999, and attracted about three thousand visitors in its first year.

The collection contained about 110 carved animals, an operational Wurlitzer band organ, chariots, and other artifacts. The exhibits featured European animals, major American carvers, armored horses, and the restoration process. The museum closed in late 2010, initially with the intent of relocating, but the closure was later made permanent.

References

Art museums established in 1983
Museums in Hood River County, Oregon
Buildings and structures in Hood River, Oregon
Carousels in the United States
Amusement museums in the United States
1983 establishments in Oregon
2010 disestablishments in Oregon